Men Ajlikom is a 2015 Lebanese biblical drama film directed by Carmelite Fr. Charles Sawaya and stars Chadi Haddad as Jesus Christ in the first drama film directed by Sawaya after he had entered the monastery.  The film had its theatrical premiere on March 26, 2015, in Dbayeh.

Plot 
According to the Christian belief, Jesus Christ was sent by God the Father to carry the humans woes. Thus the film starts by showing the pain of humans occurring at the same time with the sufferings of Jesus.

Cast
 Chadi Haddad as Jesus Christ
 Mirana Neeymeh
 Nada Saybeh
 Georges Bassil

Nomination
2015, Nomination as Best Actor for Chadi Haddad at the 2015 International catholic film festival 
 2015, Nomination as 'Best Short Film' at the 2015 International Catholic Film Festival.

References

External links

2015 films
2015 drama films
Lebanese short films
2010s Arabic-language films
Silent films
Films about Jesus
Film portrayals of Jesus' death and resurrection
Portrayals of Jesus in film
Films shot in Lebanon
Films set in the 1st century
Portrayals of the Virgin Mary in film
Religious epic films